= Kenya–Libya relations =

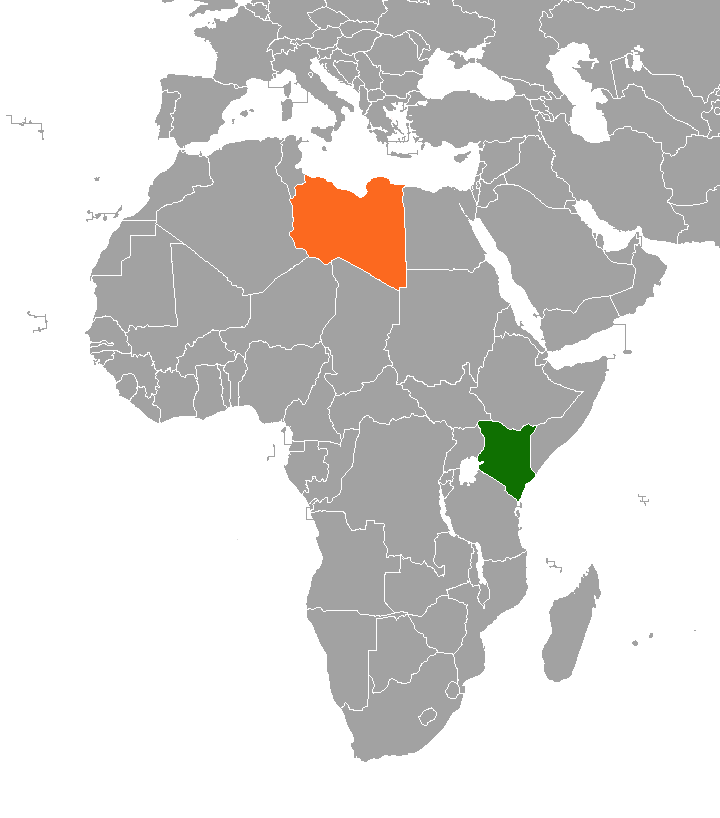

- Kenya: Libya

Kenya–Libya relations are bilateral relations between Kenya and Libya. In 2014, the Kenyan government announced that it was closing Kenya's embassy in Tripoli.

== History ==
Under Kenyan President Daniel arap Moi, relations between Kenya and Libya were hostile. Libya had been designated as a state sponsor of terrorism. In December 1987, Kenya closed the Libyan embassy in Nairobi. Libya, had been accused of gross interference in Kenya's internal affairs. Kenya had since May 1987 expelled six Libyan diplomats. It was said that the hostile relations between both countries were as a result of Kenya's close relations with the West. The Kenyan government also had concerns that Libya was intent on destabilising the country.

Under President Mwai Kibaki, relations with Libya gradually improved. Relations eventually led to Libya becoming one of Kenya's leading FDI partners. President Kibaki also visited Libya.

Kenya was then said to be scouting from alternative FDI sources other than the West.

Immediately after the collapse of Gaddafi's administration, Kenya immediately recognised the National Transitional Council as Libya's new government. Libya's embassy in Nairobi flew the NTC flag in September 2011. This occurred after a meeting in New York between Kenya's Foreign Minister and the Prime Minister of the NTC.

== Development cooperation ==
Under Gaddafi's Libya Africa Portfolio for Investments (LAP) programme the Libyan government made numerous investments in Kenya. Including buying of the Laico Regency Hotel and buying all of ExxonMobil's assets in Kenya and rebranding as OiLibya.

== Diplomatic missions ==
- Kenya embassy in Tripoli was closed in 2014.
- Libya has an embassy in Nairobi.
